Yuriy Volodymyrovych Chonka (born 31 May 1991) is a Ukrainian amateur football midfielder who plays for Sevlyush Vynohradiv.

Career
Chonka was awarded the title of best football player in Zakarpattia in 2010 among amateur teams.

On 16 February 2011 he signed a 5-year contract with FC Metalist.

References

External links 
 
 
 

1991 births
Living people
Ukrainian footballers
Ukrainian people of Hungarian descent
Association football midfielders
Ukrainian expatriate footballers
Expatriate footballers in Belarus
Expatriate footballers in Hungary
SC Beregvidek Berehove players
FC Metalist Kharkiv players
FC Naftan Novopolotsk players
Balmazújvárosi FC players
FC Uzhhorod players
Ukrainian First League players
Ukrainian Second League players